Paul Telfer (born 30 October 1979) is a Scottish actor. He plays Xander Kiriakis on the NBC soap opera Days of Our Lives, for which he was nominated for the Daytime Emmy Award for Outstanding Supporting Actor in a Drama Series in  2020.

Career
He appeared in the title role for 2005 TV miniseries Hercules. In 2007, Telfer appeared in five episodes of the second series of the BBC drama Hotel Babylon (as Luke), and in three episodes of the TV series NCIS,, as Marine Corporal Damon Werth: "Corporal Punishment", "Outlaws and In-laws" and "Jack Knife."
He also played Alexander in The Vampire Diaries as one of the original five vampire hunters, in Season 4 of the show (which aired in 2012). this role was a guest appearance.

In January 2015, Telfer was cast on Days of Our Lives as Damon, a hitman hired by Victor Kiriakis; soon after, he was cast in the role of Xander Kiriakis. In April 2019, it was revealed that Paul had returned to the show, signing contract. In late 2019, he guest starred in an episode of Agents of S.H.I.E.L.D. as Viro.

Personal life
Telfer graduated with First Class honours in Film Studies from the University of Kent at Canterbury in 1999. He is married to Broadway actress Carmen Cusack.

Filmography

Awards and nominations

References

External links
 

1979 births
Living people
Alumni of the University of Kent
Male actors from Paisley, Renfrewshire
Scottish male film actors
Scottish male television actors
Scottish male video game actors
21st-century Scottish male actors